Billbergia rosea is a species of flowering plant in the genus Billbergia. This species is native to Venezuela and to the Island of Trinidad.

References

rosea
Flora of Venezuela
Flora of Trinidad and Tobago
Plants described in 1856
Flora without expected TNC conservation status